Mark A.Z. Dippé (born November 9, 1956) is a Japanese-born American film director and visual effects supervisor. He made his directorial debut in 1997 with Spawn.

Biography
Mark Earnest Dippé was born in Japan to a Chinese mother and an American father, both of whom worked for the United States Army. At the age of two, the Dippés moved back to the United States, where his father was discharged from the Army. Dippé grew up in Anchorage, Alaska, after his family moved there in 1960. When Dippé was 5, he persuaded his mother to take him to see the 1958 horror film The Fly. The film's transformation sequences impressed the child, who would grow an interest in visual effects. He left home at 17 for college, earning a Ph.D in computer graphics at the University of California, Berkeley in 1985. In 1988, he went to Industrial Light & Magic as some friends of his were hired to do the computer-generated imagery for The Abyss. Dippé wrote most of the code that created a photorealistic pseudopod built out of seawater, which was mostly animated by Steve 'Spaz' Williams. Dippé's later work included the T-1000 in Terminator 2: Judgment Day, and the dinosaurs of Jurassic Park, which were rendered in computer graphics after a successful demo made by Williams and Dippé. Dippé, Williams and Clint Goldman left ILM in 1997, forming production companies Pull Down Your Pants and Complete Pandemonium. The former was a production company in Dippé's directorial debut, the comic book adaptation Spawn, and the latter created various television commercials in the following years.

He is co-founder of The Animation Picture Company.

Filmography

References

External links
 

Film directors from Alaska
Special effects people
Living people
1958 births
Artists from Anchorage, Alaska
Visual effects supervisors
American voice directors
American film directors of Chinese descent
Industrial Light & Magic people